Mariam Stepanyan (born 22 September 1989) is an Armenian retired professional footballer who played as a forward in Armenia women's national football team. Before she started to play football she was on the Armenian National woman's Team of Handball. She started to play football for FC Banants. She won the Armenian league champion twice with FC Urartu, and twice with Yerevan FC G.M and got best defenders title of the season.

Soccer achievements

2007 – First Place, Christiansen, in Norway
2007 – Third Place, Norway Cup, in Oslo
2009 – First Place, FC Urartu in Armenia
2008 –  First place, friendly tournament, Macedonia
2011 –  First Place, European pre-selection stage, Group 2 Malta
2013 -  Second place, Armenian women's national football team "FRIENDSHIP"International Tournament, Krasnodar
2014-2015  – First place, FC Yerevan-G.M. Armenian Women's autumn tournament Armenia
2014-2015 – Mariam Stepanyan (Yerevan-G.M.) – best defender in Armenian Women's autumn tournament.

Achievements as a Coach

2016-2017 -  First Place, Winner of the Armenian A group championship Armenia
2017-2018 -  First Place, Three-time winner of "PSS" Football's camp Championship, head coach, Poland
2017-2018 -  First Place, Winner of the Armenian A group championship Armenia
2018-2019 -  First Place, Yerevan L.H team awarded with gold medals and cup Armenia
2019 -       Second Place, "Fc Alashkert Girls" Second place Armenian Cup 
2020 -       Second place  "FA Alashkert Girls"  Women's Open Futsal Championship
2019-2020 - First Place, Winner of the Armenian A group championship Armenia

On October 7, the Georgia-Armenia match of the first qualifying round of the B League of the UEFA Women's European U-17 Championship took place in Luxembourg.The Armenian U-17 women's team beat the opponent with a big score of 3:0.This was the first ever win for the Women's U17 team 

Armenia U-17 - Head coach: Mariam Stepanyan

1. Ella De Cruyff, 3. Ani Ohanyan (2. Susanna Sahakyan, 89), 4. Tahlia Zadeyan, 6. Suzanna Hakobyan (19. Rosalina Yeritsyan, 74), 7. Marianna Vardanyan, 9. Ani Safaryan, 10. Elina Martirosyan, 11. Tatev Khachatryan, 14. Diana Melikbekyan (C), 17. Isabela Nersesyan, 21. Maria Vardanyan.
Reserves. 16. Lilit Babayan, 5. Gayane Grigoryan, 8. Armine Vardanyan, 13. Karine Mkrtchyan, 15. Valentina Grigoryan, 18. Narine Iskandaryan, 20. Knarik Baghdasaryan.

2023 UEFA Women's Under-17 Championship qualification

Group B1

Champions League

FC Alashkert women's team will take part in 2019–20 UEFA Women's Champions League as the successor of Ani-1 team. Ani-1 became the winner of the Armenian A group championship in 2018–19 season.

2019-2020

2020-2021
The match between Kharkov and Alashkert in the first qualifying round of the UEFA Women's Champions League took place on November 4 in Ukraine.

Group B2

Group B2

Referee career
Armenian football referee, the matches of the championship of Armenia among men and women. Start's 2009 to take a referee's course two years Armenian State Institute of Physical Culture and also National junior League matches then 1 league.
After two years she started to be assistant referees then in 2014 she was nominated as a FIFA international referee's assistant and she placed on FIFA's list in 2015.
Her first international match was between  3-0  UEFA Women's Under-19 Championship Qualifying round- Group 3
13/09/2014 In Loni Papuciu Stadium (Albania) 
In 2016 April 12 in Stadion pod Malim brdom she judged woman's Euro 2017 Qualifying group stage-Group 2  vs 
In 2016 October 19 to_24 she judged UEFA Women's Under-19 Championship Qualifying Round Group 10  6-0   and then  3-0  and   1-0 .

Coaching career
She started to help her coach Liana Hayrapetyan in the club Yerevan L.H. (Armenia) on the position assistant of head coach who'sin the meantime the head coach of Armenia women's national football team.  In 2016, she received a diploma for the title of the Best Coach of female division in autumn season. In 2016 of December she graduated the courses of UEFA B Licence In Armenia. In 2017 and 2018 on the summer she started work in Poland P.S.S.  as a football coach.

The 2021 Armenia Women's International Friendly Tournament, also known as the Our Game International Friendly Tournament,[1] was a friendly international women's football championship. It was held in Armenia from 7 to 12 April 2021, and was played by four teams: Lithuania, Armenia, Jordan, and Lebanon.[2] The tournament was won by Lithuania, whereas hosts Armenia finished runners-up.[3]

Other tournaments

https://en.wikipedia.org/wiki/2021_Armenia_Women%27s_International_Friendly_Tournament

Group stage

See also
List of Armenia women's international footballers

References

External links
 https://www.ffa.am/hy/news/kananc-hayastani-m-17-havaqakany-hakhtec-vrastanin
 http://www.ffa.am/en/1581062946
 https://www.uefa.com/womenseuro/news/01ef-0e122319cb23-2953f36be2c0-1000--armenia-in-dreamland-after-pipping-malta/?referrer=%2Fwomenseuro%2Fnews%2Fnewsid%3D1604209
 http://www.uefa.com/womenseuro/news/newsid=1604209.html
 http://www.ffa.am/en/1419340729#.V-2QVYG4eT0.google_plusone_share
 http://ffa.am/en/national-teams/womennationalteam/players/mariamstepanyan/
 http://www.uefa.com/teamsandplayers/players/player=1906851/profile/index.html Profile at UEFA.com
 http://old.ffa.am/en/national-teams/womennationalteam/players/mariamstepanyan/
 http://old.ffa.am/am/national-teams/womennationalteam/players/mariamstepanyan/

1989 births
Living people
Armenian women's footballers
Armenia women's international footballers
Women's association football forwards
Women referees and umpires